Timmons is a surname, and may refer to:

Persons
 Andy Timmons (born 1963), American rock guitarist
 Bob Timmons (1902–2004), American college basketball coach
 Bobby Timmons (1935–1974), American jazz pianist and composer
 Charlie Timmons (1917–1996), American football player
 Jeff Timmons (born 1973), American pop singer; founding member of the pop group 98 Degrees
 Joe Timmons (born 1952), Scottish football referee
 John Timmons (1890–1964), Scottish politician; MP for Bothwell 1945–1964
 John Morgan Timmons (1800–1863), Baptist minister; founder of Timmonsville, South Carolina
 Larry Timmons (1948–1997), Irish Roman Catholic missionary; murdered in Kenya
 Lawrence Timmons (born 1986), American football player
 Marcus Timmons (born 1971), American-born basketball player, playing for Adelaide, Australia
 Mark Timmons (contemporary), Irish Gaelic football player
 Ozzie Timmons (born 1970), American baseball player
 Patricia Timmons-Goodson (born 1954), American jurist on the Supreme Court of the State of North Carolina
 Richard Timmons (born 1956), American murderer
 Rick Timmons (born 1957), American painter
 Steve Timmons (born 1958), American Olympic volleyball player
 Stuart Timmons (1957–2017), American LGBT historian and activist
 Tim Timmons (born 1967), American baseball umpire
 Tim Timmons (born 1976), American Christian musician
 Tyrone Timmons (born 1984), American arena football player
 William Timmons (lobbyist), American politician, lobbyist and transition chief for the McCain campaign
 William Timmons, United States representative

 Fictional characters
 Keith Timmons, character on the American soap opera Santa Barbara

See also
 Timmins
 Timon (disambiguation)